Corybas cheesemanii, commonly known as Cheesemans spider orchid or spurred helmet orchid, is a species of terrestrial orchid endemic to New Zealand. It is a small orchid with a single pale green, heart-shaped leaf and usually only a single flower variously coloured from maroon to completely white. It usually grows in deep shade, often in deep leaf litter and flowers in autumn and winter.

Description 
The leaf is green on the upper surface and silvery green on the lower side. The largest part of the flower is the dorsal sepal which is hood-like, completely covering the rest of the flower. The lateral sepals are tiny and the petals are usually not detectable. The labellum is cream-coloured or white, tube-shaped near the base with a narrow spur pointing downwards on either side at its base.

Taxonomy 
This orchid was first formally described in 1871 by Thomas Kirk after an unpublished description by Joseph Dalton Hooker. Kirk gave it the name Corysanthes cheesemanii from specimens collected by Thomas Frederick Cheeseman and published the description in Transactions and Proceedings of the New Zealand Institute. In 1891, Otto Kuntze changed the name to Corybas cheesemanii. The specific epithet (cheesemanii) honours the collector of the type specimens.

Distribution and habitat
Cheesemans spider orchid grows in deep shade, often buried in deep rotting leaf litter in tall scrub or forest. It occurs on the North, South, Three Kings and Chatham Islands.

Conservation
Corybas cheesemanii is classified as "not threatened" by the New Zealand Government Department of Conservation.

References 

cheesemanii
Endemic orchids of New Zealand
Plants described in 1871
Taxa named by Thomas Kirk